The 2010 South Carolina Gamecocks football team represented the University of South Carolina in the 2010 NCAA Division I FBS football season. The team's head coach was Steve Spurrier, who was in his sixth season at USC. The Gamecocks played their home games at Williams-Brice Stadium in Columbia, South Carolina and were members of the East Division of the Southeastern Conference.  The Gamecocks finished the season 9–5, 5–3 in SEC play to win the East Division. They earned their first appearance in the SEC Championship where they were defeated by Auburn 17–56. They were invited to the Chick-fil-A Bowl, where they were defeated by Florida State 17–26.

Preseason
On April 10, 2010, the White squad defeated the Garnet squad, 21–17, in the annual Garnet & Black Spring Game, in front of a crowd of 22,000.

Schedule
The October 9 game against Alabama played host to ESPN's College GameDay, the program's 5th time hosting the popular ESPN show.

Game summaries

Southern Miss

Quarterback Stephen Garcia and freshman running back Marcus Lattimore each rushed for two touchdowns and USC head coach Steve Spurrier won his 18th straight season opener, 41-13 over Southern Miss. Sophomore wide receiver Alshon Jeffery also had 106 receiving yards and freshman wide receiver Ace Sanders had a 53-yard run off of a reverse. Freshman backup quarterback Connor Shaw also had a highlight, throwing his first touchdown pass as a Gamecock to wide receiver D.L. Moore.

Georgia

Freshman running back Marcus Lattimore carried for 182 yards and two touchdowns, as #24 South Carolina outmatched #22 Georgia, 17-6, in the SEC opener for both teams. Quarterback Stephen Garcia was 12-17 for 165 yards, with seven of his passes caught by wide receiver Alshon Jeffery, who finished with 103 yards. Lattimore had 103 yards rushing in the first half, and USC held a 228-73 edge in total yards after the first two quarters. Georgia's 6 points were the fewest allowed by Carolina to a Bulldog team since a 2-0 USC victory in 1904, and the Gamecock defense held the Bulldogs to 61 rushing yards. Head Coach Steve Spurrier won his 106th SEC game, tying him for second all-time in the conference with former Ole Miss coach Johnny Vaught.

Furman

Stephen Garcia went 13-20 for 150 yards with two touchdown passes, and Marcus Lattimore had 19 carries for 97 yards and a touchdown to lead the #13 Gamecocks to a 38-19 win over Furman. Cornerback Stephon Gilmore sealed the game with an 80-yard interception return for touchdown in the 4th quarter.

Auburn

Alabama

USC toppled Alabama at home to notch their first defeat of a top-ranked team in school history.

Kentucky

Vanderbilt

Tennessee

Arkansas

Florida

Troy

Clemson

2010 SEC Championship vs. Auburn

2010 Chick-fil-A Bowl vs. Florida State

Players

Depth chart 
Projected starters and primary backups for SEC Championship Game versus Auburn on December 4, 2010.

Awards
 Steve Spurrier - SEC Coach of the Year
 Stephen Garcia - Maxwell Award Watch List; Manning Award Watch List; Walter Camp National Offensive Player of the Week, 10/10/10; SEC Offensive Player of the Week, 10/11/10; Davey O'Brien National Quarterback of the Week, 10/11/10; Capital One Cup Impact Performance of the Week, 10/14/10
 Alshon Jeffery - Biletnikoff Award Finalist; Maxwell Award Watch List; Rivals.com National Player of the Week, 10/11/10; AFCA Coaches' All-America Team; AP & Coaches First-Team All-SEC; Walter Camp Second-Team All-American
 T.J. Johnson - SEC Offensive Lineman of the Week, 9/6/10
 Spencer Lanning - Lou Groza Award Watch List, Ray Guy Award Nominee; SEC Special Teams Player of the Week, 11/15/10; SEC Special Teams Player of the Week, 11/29/10
 Marcus Lattimore - Maxwell Award Watch List; SEC Offensive Player of the Week & SEC Freshman of the Week, 9/13/10; SEC Freshman of the Week, 11/1/10; SEC Offensive Player of the Week, 11/15/10; SEC Freshman of the Week, 11/22/10; AP & Coaches First-Team All-SEC; AP & Coaches SEC Freshman of the Year; Walter Camp Second-Team All-American
 Devin Taylor - SEC Defensive Lineman of the Week, 11/1/10; AP First-Team All-SEC; Coaches Second-Team All-SEC
 Garrett Chisolm - Campbell Trophy Semifinalist; Coaches Second-Team All-SEC
 Stephon Gilmore - Bednarik Award Watch List, Nagurski Trophy Watch List; Coaches First-Team All-SEC; AP Second-Team All-SEC
 Cliff Matthews - Hendricks Award Watch List, Nagurski Trophy Watch List, Lott Trophy Watch List; Coaches Second-Team All-SEC

2010 recruiting class

Rankings

Coaching staff
 Steve Spurrier - Head Coach
 Ellis Johnson - Assistant Head Coach & Defense Assistant Coach
 Lorenzo Ward - Defensive Coordinator & Safeties
 Shane Beamer - Cornerbacks/Special Teams & Recruiting Coordinator
 Shawn Elliott - Offensive Line/Running Game Coordinator
 Craig Fitzgerald  - Strength & Conditioning
 Jay Graham - Running Backs
 Johnson Hunter - Tight Ends
 Brad Lawing - Defensive Line
 G.A. Mangus - Quarterbacks
 Steve Spurrier, Jr. - Wide Receivers

References

South Carolina
South Carolina Gamecocks football seasons
South Carolina Gamecocks football